The Rag Picker, also released as A Good Joke, was an 1896 French silent film directed by Georges Méliès. It was released by Méliès's company Star Film and is numbered 9 in its catalogues. The film is currently presumed lost.

References

External links 
 

1896 films
French short documentary films
French silent short films
French black-and-white films
Films directed by Georges Méliès
Lost French films
1890s short documentary films
1890s lost films
1890s French films